Evangelical Lutheran Worship (ELW) is the current primary liturgical and worship guidebook and hymnal for use in the Evangelical Lutheran Church in America and the Evangelical Lutheran Church in Canada, replacing its predecessor, the Lutheran Book of Worship (LBW) of 1978, and its supplements, Hymnal Supplement 1991 (published by GIA Publications, a Roman Catholic publishing house) and With One Voice (WOV) (published in 1995 by Augsburg Fortress, the ELCA's publishing house).

Evangelical Lutheran Worship was first published in October 2006.  Though not all ELCA and ELCIC congregations immediately adopted the book, demand for it was so great that it sold out its first and second printings and some congregations had to delay its adoption until more were available.

The book includes ten musical settings of the liturgy for the Holy Communion service, three of which were previously published in the Lutheran Book of Worship (1978), as well as a Service of the Word.  Morning Prayer (Matins), Evening Prayer (Vespers), and Night Prayer (Compline) are all included, as are occasional and pastoral offices such as baptism, marriage, burial, individual confession, and proper services for Ash Wednesday, Palm Sunday, and the Triduum. Martin Luther's Small Catechism is also printed in the book.  A Prayer of the Day or Collect is included for each Sunday of each year of the lectionary cycle.  Unlike the abbreviated Psalter included in the LBW, ELW includes the entire Book of Psalms in a version for congregational prayer and singing.  Compared to the LBW, the selection of hymns is expanded, including many options from previously published Evangelical Lutheran worship/liturgical books, hymnals and hymnal supplements in America in the last two centuries.

In 2020, a supplement called All Creation Sings was published. It has two settings of Holy Communion, a Service of the Word (similar to LBW and WOV), and new hymns and songs.

See also
List of English-language hymnals by denomination

External links
 Evangelical Lutheran Worship

Lutheran hymnals
2006 non-fiction books